Stenalia siamensis is a beetle in the genus Stenalia of the family Mordellidae. It was described in 1995 by Horák.

References

siamensis
Beetles described in 1995